was a Japanese writer and translator of English and Russian literature. She was a recipient of the Women's Literature Prize, the Yomiuri Prize, and Japan Academy of the Arts prize.

Biography
Amino was born in Azabu Mamiana-cho and raised in Akasaka, Tokyo, where her father was a well-to-do sadler. Her mother left when Amino was six, after which she had three stepmothers. She graduated from the Japan Women's University in 1920 with a degree in English, then worked as a part-time assistant editor at a magazine, and from 1921-1926 a substitute English teacher at the university. In 1921 she published a self-financed collection of stories entitled Aki (Autumn), and in 1923 met author Shiga Naoya whose disciple she became. She married in 1930, living in Hooten, Manchuria, from 1930–1938, but divorced in 1936. She did not publish while married, but made a comeback with a collection of short stories called Kisha no nakade (On the Train) in 1940.

She was a member of the Japan Art Academy and received the 1947 Women's Literature Prize for Kin no kan (A Golden Coffin), and the 1967 Yomiuri Prize and Japan Academy of the Arts prize for her short story Ichigo ichie (Once in a Lifetime). She is buried in Aoyama Reien, 2-32-2 Minami Aoyama, where Shiga Naoya is also buried.

References

Sources 
 Donald Keene, Dawn to the West: Japanese literature of the modern era, fiction, Volume 1, 2nd edition, Columbia University Press, 1998, pages 528–531. .
 Japanese Wikipedia article
 Prominent People of Minato City (with photo)

Japanese writers
1900 births
1978 deaths
Yomiuri Prize winners
Burials in Japan